Saponi is an extinct Papuan language of Indonesia.

It was spoken in Botawa village of Waropen Bawah Subdistrict in Waropen Regency. Woria is also spoken in Botawa village.

It shared half of its basic vocabulary with the Rasawa language, but it is not clear that they were related. Saponi shared none of its pronouns with the Lakes Plain family that Rasawa is part of; indeed its basic pronouns mamire "I, we" and ba "thou" are reminiscent of proto–East Bird's Head *meme "we" and *ba "thou".

References

Languages of western New Guinea
Wapoga languages
Unclassified languages of New Guinea
Endangered unclassified languages
Extinct languages of Oceania